Semiclivina is a genus of beetles in the family Carabidae, containing the following species:

 Semiclivina bergeri Dostal, 2011
 Semiclivina dentipes Dejean, 1825
 Semiclivina doolani (Baehr, 2008)
 Semiclivina oxyomma (Putzeys, 1868)
 Semiclivina schmidi Dostal, 2011
 Semiclivina urophthalma Putzeys, 1861
 Semiclivina urophthalmoides Kult, 1947
 Semiclivina vespertina Putzeys, 1866

References

Scaritinae